Suaeda australis, the austral seablite, is a species of plant in the family Amaranthaceae, native to Australia. The leaves are up to 40 mm in length and are succulent, linear and flattened. They are light green to purplish-red in colour.

The species occurs on shorelines in coastal or estuarine areas or in salt marshes. It is native across Australia including the states of Queensland, New South Wales, Victoria, Tasmania, South Australia and the south-west of Western Australia.

In irrigated areas, the species is known as a salinity indicator plant and is referred to as redweed.

References

External links
Online Field guide to Common Saltmarsh Plants of Queensland
Suaeda australis occurrence data from Australasian Virtual Herbarium

australis
Caryophyllales of Australia
Halophytes
Flora of New South Wales
Flora of Queensland
Flora of South Australia
Flora of Tasmania
Flora of Victoria (Australia)
Eudicots of Western Australia